This article gives an overview of the mire plant communities in the British National Vegetation Classification system.

Introduction

The mire communities of the NVC were described in Volume 2 of British Plant Communities, first published in 1991, along with the heath communities.

In total, 38 mire communities have been identified.

The mire communities consist of a number of separate subgroups.

 five bog plane communities (M17, M18, M19, M20 and M21)
 two wet heath communities (M15 and M16)
 four bog-pool communities (M1, M2, M3 and M4)
 four base-poor small sedge & rush communities (M5, M6, M7 and M8)
 six base-poor small sedge & Schoenus communities (M9, M10, M11, M12, M13 and M14)
 seven fen-meadow / rush-pasture communities (M22, M23, M24, M26, M25, M27 and M28)
 two soakaway communities (M29 and M30)
 eight communities of springs and rills (M31, M32, M33, M34, M35, M36, M37 and M38)

List of mire communities

The following is a list of the communities that make up this category:

 M1 Sphagnum auriculatum bog pool community
 M2 Sphagnum cuspidatum/recurvum bog pool community
 M3 Eriophorum angustifolium bog pool community
 M4 Carex rostrata - Sphagnum recurvum mire
 M5 Carex rostrata - Sphagnum squarrosum mire
 M6 Carex echinata - Sphagnum recurva/auriculatum mire
 M7 Carex curta - Sphagnum russowii mire
 M8 Carex rostrata - Sphagnum warnstorfii mire
 M9 Carex rostrata - Calligeron cuspidatum/giganteum mire
 M10 Carex dioica - Pinguicula vulgaris mire Pinguiculo-Caricetum dioicae Jones 1973 emend.
 M11 Carex demissa - Saxifraga aizoides mire  Carici-Saxifragetum aizoidis McVean & Ratcliffe 1962 emend.
 M12 Carex saxatilis mire Caricetum saxatilis McVean & Ratcliffe 1962
 M13 Schoenus nigricans - Juncus subnodulosus mire Schoenetum nigricantis Koch 1926
 M14 Schoneus nigricans - Narthecium ossifragum mire
 M15 Scirpus cespitosus - Erica tetralix wet heath
 M16 Erica tetralix - Sphagnum compactum wet heath Ericetum tetralicis Schwickerath 1933
 M17 Scirpus cespitosus - Eriophorum vaginatum blanket mire
 M18 Erica tetralix - Sphagnum papillosum raised and blanket mire
 M19 Calluna vulgaris - Eriophorum vaginatum blanket mire
 M20 Eriophorum vaginatum raised and blanket mire
 M21 Narthecium ossifragum - Sphagnum papillosum valley mire Narthecio-Sphagnetum euatlanticum Duvigneaud 1949
 M22 Juncus subnodulosus - Cirsium palustre fen-meadow
 M23 Juncus effusus/acutiflorus - Galium palustre rush-pasture
 M24 Molinia caerulea - Cirsium dissectum fen-meadow Cirsium-Molinietum caeruleae Sissingh & De Vries 1942 emend.
 M25 Molinia caerulea - Potentilla erecta mire
 M26 Molinia caerulea - Crepis paludosa mire
 M27 Filipendula ulmaria - Angelica sylvestris mire
 M28 Iris pseudacorus - Filipendula ulmaria mire Filipendulo-Iridetum pseudacori Adam 1976 emend.
 M29 Hypericum elodes - Potamogeton polygonifolius soakaway Hyperico-Potametum polygonifolii (Allorge 1921) Braun-Blanquet & Tüxen 1952
 M30 Related vegetation of seasonally-inundated habitats Hydrocotyla-Baldellion Tüxen & Dierssen 1972
 M31 Anthelia judacea - Sphagnum auriculatum spring Sphagno auriculati-Anthelietum judaceae Shimwell 1972
 M32 Philonotis fontana - Saxifraga stellaris spring Philonoto-Saxifragetum stellaris Nordhagen 1943
 M33 Pohlia wahlenbergii var. glacialis spring Pohlietum glacialis McVean & Ratcliffe 1962
 M34 Carex demissa - Koenigia islandica flush
 M35 Ranunculus omiophyllus - Montia fontana rill
 M36 Lowland springs and streambanks of shaded situations Cardaminion (Maas 1959) Westhoff & den Held 1969
 M37 Cratoneuron commutatum - Festuca rubra spring
 M38 Cratoneuron commutatum - Carex nigra spring

References
National Vegetation Classification field guide to mires and heaths by Joint Nature Conservation Committee